Paul Shaw may refer to:

 Paul Shaw (footballer) (born 1973), English footballer and coach
 Paul Shaw (cricketer) (born 1967), former English cricketer
 Paul Shaw (sport shooter), represented Canada at the 2010 Commonwealth Games
 Paul Shaw (rugby league), 
 Paul A. Shaw (born 1947), British geographer
 Paul Shaw (design historian), American designer, calligrapher and historian of design

See also
Pauly Shore (born 1968), American comedian and actor